Mid Ulster is a parliamentary constituency in the UK House of Commons. The current MP is Francie Molloy of Sinn Féin.

Constituency profile
The seat covers a rural area to the west of Lough Neagh, including part of the Sperrins. The seat is nationalist-leaning.

Boundaries

1950–1983: The Urban Districts of Cookstown, Omagh, and Strabane, the Rural Districts of Castlederg, Cookstown, Magherafelt, and Strabane, and that part of the Rural District of Omagh not contained within the constituency of Fermanagh and South Tyrone.

1983–1997: the Cookstown District Council; the Omagh District Council; the Magherafelt District Council wards of Ballymaguigan, Draperstown, and Lecumpher; and the Strabane District Council wards of Castlederg, Clare, Finn, Glenderg, Newtownstewart, Plumbridge, Sion Mills, and Victoria Bridge.

1997–present: the District of Cookstown; the District of Magherafelt; and the Dungannon and South Tyrone Borough Council wards of Altmore, Coalisland North, Coalisland South, Coalisland West and Newmills, Donaghmore, and Washing Bay.

The constituency was created in 1950 when the old two-seat constituency of Fermanagh and Tyrone was abolished as part of the final move to single-member seats. Originally, the seat primarily consisted of the northern, eastern and western parts of County Tyrone, with the south included in Fermanagh and South Tyrone. Of the post-1973 districts, it contained all of Omagh and Cookstown and part of Strabane and Magherafelt.

In boundary changes proposed by a review in 1995, the seat was split in two, with the name retained by the eastern half, even though it contained only 30% of the old seat. The western half became the nucleus of the new West Tyrone constituency. The new Mid Ulster also gained areas from East Londonderry and Fermanagh and South Tyrone, taking it deeper into County Londonderry.

History
For the history of the constituency prior to 1950, see Fermanagh and Tyrone.

In both its incarnations, Mid Ulster has seen a precarious balance between unionist and Irish nationalist voters, although in recent years the nationalists have advanced significantly to be in a clear majority. Many elections have seen a candidate from one side triumph due to candidates from the other side splitting the vote.

The seat was initially won by the Irish Nationalist Party in 1950 and 1951 then by Sinn Féin in 1955. However the Sinn Féin Member of Parliament (MP) was unseated on petition on the basis that his Irish Republican Army (IRA) convictions made him ineligible, and in subsequent by-elections the seat was won by the Ulster Unionist Party (UUP).

In a by-election in 1969, the seat was won by Bernadette Devlin standing as an independent socialist nationalist on the "Unity" ticket, which sought to unite nationalist voters behind a single candidate. At the age of 21, Devlin was the youngest person ever elected to the House of Commons in the era of universal suffrage. The by-election saw a 91.5% turnout, a record for any UK by-election.

Devlin held her seat in the 1970 general election but generated controversy when she had a child while still unmarried as well as for her fierce anti-clericalism. The Social Democratic and Labour Party (SDLP) stood a candidate against her in the February 1974 general election and the nationalist vote was strongly divided, allowing John Dunlop of the Vanguard Progressive Unionist Party to win with the support of the UUP and the Democratic Unionist Party (DUP).

Dunlop held his seat for the next nine years, though in 1975 he was part of a large section of Vanguard that broke away to form the short-lived United Ulster Unionist Party. He held his seat in 1979 only owing to a unionist pact. He polled poorly in the 1982 Assembly election, taking 2.8% of the vote. Consequently, he did not stand again in 1983, and the following year the UUUP was wound up.

The 1983 general election saw a fierce contest for the seat, with the UUP, DUP, SDLP and Sinn Féin all polling strongly. The winner was the DUP's William McCrea, by a narrow majority of just 78 over Sinn Féin's Danny Morrison. In general elections from then to 2005 the UUP did not contest the seat.

Following the boundary changes, McCrea contested the new Mid Ulster in 1997 but, by then, Sinn Féin had established itself as the most likely party to outpoll a unionist and so drew votes from the SDLP, resulting in Martin McGuinness winning. He held the seat at the general elections of 2001, 2005 and 2010. During the 2001 general election, Mid Ulster had the highest turnout in any constituency in the United Kingdom.

On 11 June 2012, McGuinness announced his intention to resign from the House of Commons to concentrate on his position as Deputy First Minister and avoid so-called 'double jobbing' by which members of the Northern Ireland Assembly also work as councillors or MPs. This necessitated a by-election. On 30 December 2012, Martin McGuinness formally announced he would resign his Westminster seat with immediate effect. Sinn Féin's Francie Molloy won the resulting by-election in March 2013.

Members of Parliament

Elections

Elections in the 2010s

Elections in the 2000s

Elections in the 1990s

Between 1992 and 1996 there were significant boundary changes, creating the new seat of West Tyrone. This had a huge knock on effect on Mid Ulster, which lost all its areas in Omagh and Strabane district councils, and gained the Torrent LGD in Dungannon from Fermanagh and South Tyrone, and the parts of Magherafelt District Council previously in East Londonderry. Therefore, the implied 1992 election results are very different from the actual ones and are displayed above.

Elections in the 1980s

Elections in the 1970s

Elections in the 1960s

Elections in the 1950s

The seat was awarded to Beattie on petition on the grounds that Mitchell's conviction as a felon made him ineligible to sit in Parliament. However, Beattie in turn was also found ineligible to sit due to holding an office of profit under the crown, triggering a further by-election.

Mitchell was subsequently unseated by a resolution of the House of Commons, on the grounds that his terrorist convictions made him ineligible to sit in Parliament.

See also
 List of parliamentary constituencies in Northern Ireland

References

Further reading
F. W. S. Craig, British Parliamentary Election Results 1918 – 1949
F. W. S. Craig, British Parliamentary Election Results 1950 – 1970

External links 
2017 Election House Of Commons Library 2017 Election report
A Vision Of Britain Through Time (Constituency elector numbers)
Guardian Unlimited Politics (Election results from 1992 to the present)
http://www.psr.keele.ac.uk/ (Election results from 1951 to the present)

Westminster Parliamentary constituencies in Northern Ireland
Politics of County Tyrone
Politics of County Londonderry